Lucas Federico Trejo (born 29 December 1987) is an Argentine football player who plays as a defender for Atlético Morelia.

Career
Trejo began his professional football career in the lower levels of Spanish football with FC L´Eskala. He signed for Greek side Atromitos F.C. in 2007, appearing for the club in the Greek Super League before going on loan to Ethnikos Asteras F.C. He also played for Egaleo F.C. in the Greek Beta Ethniki. He played for Sportivo Belgrano in the Torneo Argentino A from 2012 to 2014.

He was released by Jacksonville Armada FC in December 2015.

In July 2016, he is playing as a defender for Venezuelan football club Monagas Sport Club.

Along with Bochy Hoyos and Lucas Scaglia, he was one of three Argentinians signed by Monagas Sport Club on 29 January 2015.

References

External links

1987 births
Living people
Argentine footballers
Ethnikos Asteras F.C. players
Atromitos F.C. players
Egaleo F.C. players
Super League Greece players
Jacksonville Armada FC players
North American Soccer League players
Monagas S.C. players
Argentine expatriate footballers
Expatriate footballers in Greece
Expatriate soccer players in the United States
Association football defenders
Footballers from Córdoba, Argentina
Argentine expatriate sportspeople in Greece
Argentine expatriate sportspeople in the United States